Muhammad Jafri bin Muhammad Firdaus Chew (born 11 June 1997) is a Malaysian professional footballer who plays as a forward for Malaysia Super League club Sabah and the Malaysia U-23 national team. Jafri Firdaus Chew came up through Blue football academy (now known as the Assumption- Bintang Biru Football Academy). He started his footballing career with Harimau Muda B in 2013. On 25 November 2015, it was confirmed that the Harimau Muda has disbanded by Football Association of Malaysia which means all the player from Harimau Muda A, Harimau Muda B and Harimau Muda C will be returned to their own state. He also has been called by Frank Bernhardt, the Malaysian Under-19 National Coach for preparation of the 2016 AFF U-19 Youth Championship which was held in Hanoi, Vietnam from 11 to 24 September 2016.

This makes him joined Penang FA to play for Penang U-19 and impressed from an early stage. His performances earned him a start in first team. He made his first team debut for Penang FA in 2016, while Chew represented his country Malaysia U-22 national team international, having previously represented his country at under-17, under-19 and under-21 levels.

Club career

Penang FA 
Since Harimau Muda has disbanded by FAM which means all the player from Harimau Muda A, Harimau Muda B and Harimau Muda C has to returned to their own state. Jafri Firdaus Chew are with Penang FA for the Penang U21, before being promoted to first team in year 2016 to play in the top division of Malaysian football, the Malaysia Super League.

On 28 October 2017, Jafri has scored his first senior goals on his 24th appearance for Penang FA in the 2017 Malaysia Super League match against Selangor FA in a 1–3 defeat.

PKNS
On 5 November 2017, Jafri signed with PKNS for 2018 Malaysia Super League.

Career statistics

Club

Malaysia Under-23

Honours

International
Malaysia U-23
Southeast Asian Games
 Silver Medal: 2017

References

External links
 
 Muhammad Jafri Firdaus Chew on Eurosport Football
 Muhammad Jafri bin Muhammad Firdaus Chew on Soccer Punter

1997 births
Living people
Malaysian people of Malay descent
Malaysian sportspeople of Chinese descent
Sportspeople from Penang
People from Penang
Malaysian footballers
Malaysia international footballers
Penang F.C. players
Malaysia Super League players
Association football forwards
Southeast Asian Games silver medalists for Malaysia
Southeast Asian Games medalists in football
Competitors at the 2017 Southeast Asian Games
Malaysia youth international footballers
21st-century Malaysian people